Winograd is a Slavic and Jewish surname:
 Arthur Winograd (1920–2010), original cello player for the Juilliard String Quartet
 David Ostrosky (born David Ostrosky Winograd) a Mexican actor
 Eliyahu Winograd (1926–2018), chairman of the Winograd Commission, an Israeli government-appointed commission of inquiry regarding the 2006 Lebanon War
 Nathan Winograd, author of Redemption
 Shmuel Winograd (1936–2019), mathematician known for the Coppersmith–Winograd algorithm
 Terry Winograd (1946–), computer scientist

See also 
 
 Vinograd (disambiguation)
 Polish spelling of Vynohrad (disambiguation), villages in Ukraine
 Winograd Schema Challenge, a test of machine intelligence

Slavic-language surnames
Jewish surnames